W36EX-D, virtual and UHF digital channel 36, is a low-powered, Class A GEB Network-affiliated television station licensed to Alton, Illinois, United States. The station is owned by the Liberty Communications subsidiary of River of Life Family Church (formerly Liberty Christian Center). W36EX-D's transmitter is located on Fosterburg Road north of Alton.

The station was founded on October 28, 1998 as W50CH. Until 2020, it was one of only two stations in the United States that used virtual channel 1, alongside KAXT-CD in San Francisco/San Jose, California.

Television stations in St. Louis
Religious television stations in the United States
Television channels and stations established in 1998
1998 establishments in Illinois
Low-power television stations in the United States